King Tvrtko can refer to two medieval monarchs:
Tvrtko I of Bosnia (1338–1391), first Bosnian king
Tvrtko II of Bosnia (died 1443), son of Tvrtko I